Per Knudsen may refer to:

 Per Knudsen (Danish footballer) (1925–1999), Danish footballer
 Per Knudsen (Norwegian footballer)
 Per Knudsen (jurist) (1949–2005), Norwegian civil servant
 Per Holm Knudsen, Danish author of The True Story of How Babies Are Made